The Bitterroot River is a northward flowing  river running through the Bitterroot Valley, from the confluence of its West and East forks near Conner in southern Ravalli County to its confluence with the Clark Fork River near Missoula in Missoula County, in western Montana. The Clark Fork River is tributary to the Columbia River and ultimately, the Pacific Ocean. The Bitterroot River is a Blue Ribbon trout fishery with a healthy population of native westslope cutthroat trout and bull trout. It is the third most fly fished river in Montana behind the Madison and Big Horn Rivers.

History
The Bitterroot River is named for the bitterroot plant Lewisia rediviva, whose fleshy taproot was an important food source for Native Americans. The Salish called the river Spet-lum for "Place of the bitterroot" and In-shi-ttogh-tae-tkhu for "Willow River". French trappers knew the plant as racine amère (bitter root). The early Jesuit priest, Father De Smet, named it St. Mary's River. By the time of Washington Territory surveys by Governor Isaac I. Stevens in 1853, the name had been translated to Bitterroot River.

Watershed
The Bitterroot River watershed drains  in Ravalli and Missoula counties. The Bitterroot Valley averages 7–10 miles wide and is uniquely low gradient for western Montana streams. The river mainstem begins at the confluence of the East Fork Bitterroot River and the West Fork Bitterroot River. From there the mainstem receives numerous tributaries from the Bitterroot Mountains to the west and the Sapphire Mountains to the east. The watershed is a snowmelt dominated system with large interannual variations in streamflow and peak flows from mid-May to mid-June. The variation is compounded by extensive irrigation withdrawals and upstream reservoir storage at Painted Rocks Reservoir on the West Fork Bitterroot River with the most severely dewatered reaches along  of the river located between Woodside Crossing near Corvallis and Bell Crossing near Stevensville.

Major tributaries include Skalkaho Creek, and Lolo Creek. Lolo Creek is the primary tributary in the northern portion of the Bitterroot watershed. Lolo Creek is often completely dewatered in late summer in its lower  due to withdrawals for irrigation and rural water use.

Habitat and wildlife
Although the Bitterroot River passes close by to many residential areas, it is an excellent place for wildlife viewing. Many species of ducks and waterfowl are common along with osprey, bald eagles and heron. Elk (Cervus canadensis), moose (Alces alces), and both white-tailed deer (Odocoileus virginianus) and mule deer (Odocoileus hemionus) frequent the river as a source of water and to graze near its banks. The most notable wildlife viewing locale along the river is the famous Lee Metcalf National Wildlife Refuge, named for U.S. Senator Lee Metcalf, a pioneer of the conservation movement.

A renowned fly fishing stream, the Bitterroot River mainstem and many of its tributaries are important migratory corridors and spawning habitat for native westslope cutthroat trout (Oncorhynchus clarki lewisi) and bull trout (Salvelinus confluentus). Other native fish include mountain whitefish (Prosopium williamsoni), longnose sucker (Catostomus catostomus), slimy sculpin (Cottus cognatus), and longnose dace (Rhinichthys cataractae).

Rainbow trout (Oncorhynchus mykiss) and brown trout (Salmo trutta) are popular gamefish but are not native to the Bitterroot River watershed and pose significant threats to native trout. In Montana, rainbow trout are only native to the upper Kootenai River in the state's extreme northwest corner. Non-native rainbow trout pose one of the greatest threats to cutthroat trout by hybridization, producing "cutbows". In addition, non-native brook trout (Salvelinus fontinalis) often displace native cutthroat trout and bull trout in small streams.

Recreation
The towns along the Bitterroot River, including Hamilton, Stevensville, Missoula, and Darby are popular destinations for fly fishing, with rainbow trout being fairly prevalent and with smaller populations of brown trout and westslope cutthroat trout. The Bitterroot is a class I river from the confluence of the East and West forks to its confluence with the Clark Fork River for public access for recreational purposes.

Gallery

See also

2000–2001 fires in the Western United States
Montana Stream Access Law
List of rivers of Montana

References

Further reading

External links 
Explore the Bitterroot
 
 Lee Metcalf National Wildlife Refuge Website

Rivers of Montana
Bodies of water of Missoula County, Montana
Bodies of water of Ravalli County, Montana
Missoula, Montana